Felicity Land ( Saadat Abad) is a 2011 Iranian drama film directed by Maziar Miri.

Cast
 Hamed Behdad as Mohsen
 Leila Hatami as Yasi
 Mahnaz Afshar as Laleh
 Hossein Yari as Bahram
 Amir Aghaei as Ali
 Hengameh Ghaziani as Tahmine
 Mina Sadati as Mina

References

External links
 
 Official Website

2011 films
2011 drama films
Iranian drama films
2010s Persian-language films